Josephine Earle (February 23, 1892 – April 26, 1960/1961) was an American silent film actress who worked in the United States and the United Kingdom. Born as Josephine MacEwan (sometimes listed as McEwan), she was of Scottish descent.

Her first role was in New York as the Beauty in Henry W. Savage's production of Everywoman (1911–12). In late 1917 she accepted an invitation to go to England and appear in the stage production of The Lilac Domino. After a very stormy passage she arrived mid December with bombs dropping on London; "I was really surprised when I arrived to find London was not nearly so black as it was painted in New York." At some point in mid 1919, she was snapped up by the Gaumont Film Company.

Personal life
She was married twice, first, on the Isle of Wight to Captain James Alpheus Glen, DSC (Royal Air Force), a Canadian air force pilot who flew with the RAF during the First World War, and, second, in London to John T. Matthews. Both unions were childless.

Selected filmography
 The Two Edged Sword (1916)
 The Blue Envelope Mystery (1916)
 A Hungry Heart (1917)
 Indiscretion (1917)
 The Awakening (1917)
 The Fall of a Saint (UK, 1920)
 The Edge of Youth (1920)
 Walls of Prejudice (UK, 1920)
 Branded (1920)
 The Way of a Man (UK, 1921)
 The Knockout (1923)
 The Hotel Mouse (UK, 1923)
 Woman to Woman (UK, 1923)
 Raise the Roof (UK, 1930)

References

External links
 

1892 births
1960s deaths
Actresses from New York (state)
American silent film actresses
American expatriate actresses in the United Kingdom
20th-century American actresses
People from Brooklyn